= Traditional western medicine =

Traditional western medicine may refer to:

- Evidence-based medicine
- Pre-scientific medicine of Europe
